Utrilla is a surname. Notable people with the surname include:

Alejandro Utrilla Belbel (1889-1963), Spanish cavalry officer
Carlos Utrilla (born 1994), Mexican footballer 
David Utrilla, Peruvian businessman
Jorge Baldemar Utrilla (born 1961), Mexican politician 
Olivia Utrilla Nieto (born 1969), Mexican politician